Touched may refer to:

Books 
 Touched (play), a 1977 play by Stephen Lowe
 Touched: The Jerry Sandusky Story, a 2001 autobiography

Film and television 
 Touched (1983 film), a film directed by John Flynn
 Touched (1999 film), a film featuring Ian Tracey
 Touched (2005 film), a film produced by and starring Jenna Elfman
 Touched (2009 film), a film featuring Holliston Coleman
 Touched (2017 film), a Canadian psychological thriller film
 Touched (TV series), a Singaporean drama broadcast by SPH MediaWorks
 "Touched" (Buffy the Vampire Slayer), an episode of Buffy the Vampire Slayer
 "Touched" (Legend of the Seeker), an episode of Legend of the Seeker

Music

Albums
 Touched (Nadja album), 2003
 Touched, an album by Ken Stringfellow
 Touched (Michael Sweet album), 2007

Songs
 "Touched", a song by BoA from BoA
 "Touched", a song by My Bloody Valentine from Loveless
 "Touched", a song by VAST from Visual Audio Sensory Theater

Video games 
 WarioWare: Touched!, a 2004 Nintendo DS video game

See also 
 Touch (disambiguation)
 The Touch (disambiguation)
 Touch FM